Margaret "Maggie" Will (born November 22, 1964) is an American professional golfer who played on the LPGA Tour.

Will won three times on the LPGA Tour between 1990 and 1994.

Professional wins

LPGA Tour wins (3)

LPGA Tour playoff record (2–0)

References

External links

American female golfers
Furman Paladins women's golfers
LPGA Tour golfers
Golfers from North Carolina
People from Whiteville, North Carolina
1964 births
Living people